William Lithgow (1 January 1784 – 11 June 1864) was educated at the University of Edinburgh, graduating as a Licentiate of the Church of Scotland. He was the Auditor-General of the colony of New South Wales in Australia.

Lithgow was born in Scotland. He was an appointed member of the New South Wales Legislative Council from 30 January 1829 to 30 April 1852. He was Auditor-General from 8 November 1824 to 30 April 1852.

Lithgow died in St Leonards, New South Wales on 11 June 1864.

Legacy
The city of Lithgow in New South Wales was named in honour of William Lithgow by his friend, Surveyor-General John Oxley.

References

External links 

 Colonial Secretary's papers 1822-1877, State Library of Queensland- includes digitised correspondence and letters written by Lithgow to the Colonial Secretary of New South Wales

History of New South Wales
19th-century Ministers of the Church of Scotland
Scottish emigrants to colonial Australia
Scottish politicians
Alumni of the University of Edinburgh
Scottish colonial officials
Government audit officials
1784 births
1864 deaths
Members of the New South Wales Legislative Council
19th-century Australian politicians